Lise Koch (7 September 1938 – 29 February 2004) was a Danish athlete. She competed in the women's javelin throw at the 1960 Summer Olympics.

References

1938 births
2004 deaths
Athletes (track and field) at the 1960 Summer Olympics
Danish female javelin throwers
Olympic athletes of Denmark
Sportspeople from Aarhus